Al-Azareq is a sub-district located in al-Sayyani District, Ibb Governorate, Yemen.  Al-Azareq had a population of 6001 according to the 2004 census.

References 

Sub-districts in As Sayyani District